Marc Elton Cayeux (born 22 February 1978) is a Zimbabwean professional golfer. His father is South African, and his mother English. He was born in Lancaster, England and raised in Zimbabwe, leaving school at 14 to pursue a career in golf. He is a Zimbabwean/British dual national, but plays golf as a Zimbabwean.

Cayeux finished fourth on the Challenge Tour in 2004, to gain exemption to the full European Tour for 2005. That year he finished 82nd on the Order of Merit, with a best of third in the Scandinavian Masters by Carlsberg. He also won the Vodacom Tour Championship on the Sunshine Tour, on his way to fifth in the end of season standings. That win gained him entry to the WGC-NEC Invitational, where he played with World Number 1 and eventual winner Tiger Woods in the first round.

A less successful season in 2006 saw Cayeux return to the Sunshine Tour the following year, where he had four top three finishes on his way to eighth in the Order of Merit. In 2008, he won the Nashua Masters, and regained his place on the European Tour through the qualifying school.

In September 2010, Cayeux was involved in an automobile accident that resulted in serious injuries to himself and was fatal to the other driver involved. He was not expected to play until early 2011.

Professional wins (11)

Sunshine Tour wins (9)

1Co-sanctioned by the Challenge Tour

Sunshine Tour playoff record (0–2)

Challenge Tour wins (3)

1Co-sanctioned by the Sunshine Tour

Challenge Tour playoff record (2–0)

Results in major championships

CUT = missed the halfway cut
Note: Cayeux only played in The Open Championship.

Results in World Golf Championships

"T" = Tied

Team appearances
Eisenhower Trophy (representing Zimbabwe): 1996

See also
2008 European Tour Qualifying School graduates

References

External links

Zimbabwean male golfers
European Tour golfers
Sunshine Tour golfers
Zimbabwean expatriates in South Africa
Zimbabwean people of South African descent
Zimbabwean people of English descent
Sportspeople from Lancaster, Lancashire
Sportspeople from Harare
Golfers from Johannesburg
1978 births
Living people